Brugmansia vulcanicola, ( = "the volcanic-soil-favouring angel's trumpet" ) is a shrub or small tree belonging to the genus Brugmansia of tribe Datureae in subfamily Solanoideae of the nightshade family, Solanaceae.

Description
Brugmansia vulcanicola forms a shrub or small tree reaching  in height. The pendent, tubular / trumpet-shaped flowers are the smallest of all Brugmansia at only . The flowers can be found in shades of red, yellow, and pink.

Distribution

Toxicity

All parts of Brugmansia vulcanicola are poisonous, containing tropane alkaloids.

References

vulcanicola
Flora of Colombia
Flora of Ecuador